The Outlaws of Printmaking, also known as "The Outlaws" and "Outlaw Printmakers" are a collective of printmaking artists that exists internationally. The idea of "Outlaw Printmakers" formed from a show in New York at Big Cat Gallery in 2000.  Tony Fitzpatrick, the owner of the Big Cat Press which is associated with the gallery, decided to call a show there "Outlaw Printmaking" to reflect attitudes of the printmakers involved in a non-academic approach to prints. As pointed out by Sean Starwars, the Southern Graphic Council print conference was happening at the same time as that show in NYC across the water in New Jersey.  A handful of artists from the conference attended the show.). At that conference the core group now known as the Outlaw Printmakers formed, adopting the name from the show and continuing their own events, happenings and shows outside of the academic norm. The core members are Bill Fick, Tom Huck, The Hancock Brothers, Sean Star Wars, Dennis McNett and Cannonball Press. Many of the core artists associated with the movement cite the printmaker/artist Richard Mock as a primary influence.  Mock's political and social narrative prints appeared in the New York Times op-ed pages for more than a decade in the 1980s and early 1990s. Later the group grew to include Carlos Hernandez, Drive By Press, Ryan O'Malley, Artemio Rodriguez, Kathryn Polk, Erica Walker, Derrick Riley, and Julia Curran.

Organized by Tom Huck, a traveling exhibition titled "Outlaw Printmaking" started touring the nation in 2003 including works by Sue Coe, Michael Krueger, Peregrine Honig, and Bill Fick. 
Their work can be found in the collections of the Fogg Art Museum, Cambridge, Massachusetts; The New York Public Library, New York City, Zimmerli Art Museum at Rutgers University, Whitney Museum of American Art, Bibliothèque Nationale de France and the Museum of Modern Art.

Organized by Dennis McNett and curated by Josef Zimmerman, a museum exhibition called "Outlaws of Print" at the Ft. Wayne Museum of Art in 2018. The show featured work from all of the Outlaws which include: Richard Mock, Bill Fick, Tom Huck, Dennis McNett, Sean Starwars, John and Charles Hancock, Carlos Hernandez, Erika Walker, Kathryn Polk, Artemio Rodriguez, Martin Mazorra, Derrick Riley, Ryan O'Malley and Julia Curran.

Artists/Printmakers

Richard Mock

Richard Mock (1944 – July 28, 2006) was a printmaker, painter, sculptor, and editorial cartoonist. Mock was best known for his linocut illustrations that appeared on the Op-Ed page of The New York Times from 1980 through 1996.[1]

Born in 1944 in Long Beach, California, Mock earned his bachelor's degree, studying lithography and block printing, at the University of Michigan. Settling in New York City in 1968, Mock had exhibitions at 112 Greene Street, The Whitney (in 1973), Exit Art, and his most recent show at the Sideshow Gallery in Brooklyn. In addition, Mock's art frequently appeared on the covers of the magazines Fifth Estate (Official site: www.FifthEstate.org), Alternative Press Review and Anarchy: A Journal of Desire Armed. His work has been cited as an influence by a number of contemporary American printmakers, among them Tom Huck and Bill Fick. Huck and Fick are both members of a group of artists known as the "Outlaw Printmakers", which as a collective unit cite Mock's work as one of its main influences.

Mock died on July 28, 2006 after a long illness.

Bill Fick
Bill Fick (born October 19, 1963 in Lirik, Sumatra, Indonesia) moved to the United States when he was young and he received his BA from Duke University in 1986 and his MFA from University of North Carolina-Greensboro in 1990. Bill Fick is currently the Visiting Assistant Professor at Duke University. He has exhibited in several solo and group shows nationally and internationally including the Czech Republic, New Zealand, and Finland. In addition, throughout his career, Fick has acted as a visiting artist, artist in residence, and professor to several art schools across the country.

Sean Starwars

Sean Starwars is a printmaker living and working in Laurel, Mississippi. He is a relief printmaking artist specializing in woodcut printmaking.  Sean Starwars recently completed a project titled 'One Woodcut a Week" and is currently working on his new project 'One Woodcut a Day'.
Sean Starwars B.A. from Old Dominion University in 1996 and his M.F.A. from Louisiana State University in 1999. On his name "At first it amused him to have professionals address him as "Mr. Starwars," but he soon discovered it was also a great marketing tool for his woodcuts. "My real last name is pretty common," he said. "This is a way I could stand out."”

Tom Huck
Tom Huck (born 1971) is an American printmaker best known for his large scale satirical woodcuts. He lives and works in St. Louis, Missouri where he runs his own press, Evil Prints. He is a regular contributor to BLAB! of Fantagraphics Books. His work draws heavily upon the influence of Albrecht Dürer, José Guadalupe Posada, R. Crumb, and Honoré Daumier Huck states in his artist statement: "My work deals with personal observations about the experiences of living in a small town in southeast Missouri.

The often Strange and Humorous occurrences, places, and people in these towns offer a never-ending source of inspiration for my prints. I call this work 'rural satire' Huck's woodcut prints are included in numerous public and private collections, including the Whitney Museum of American Art, Spencer Museum of Art, Nelson Atkins Museum of Art, Saint Louis Art Museum, Milwaukee Art Museum, Minneapolis Institute of Art, Fogg Art Museum, and New York Public Library. Huck is represented by David Krut Art Projects in New York City, Sherry Leedy Contemporary Art in Kansas City, Mo. and Eli Ridgway Gallery in San Francisco, Ca. In September 2011 Huck was awarded a Pollock-Krasner Foundation grant.

Tony Fitzpatrick

Tony Fitzpatrick (born 1958) is an American artist born and based in Chicago.

He graduated from Montini Catholic High School in Lombard, Illinois in 1977.[1] In the early 1980s, Fitzpatrick began seriously drawing with colored pencils on slate boards in a store front gallery in the town of Villa Park, Illinois. The gallery was called The Edge. He worked by day and bartended at the bar across the street at night. During that time, he developed separate friendships with Chicago radio personality and bluesman Buzz Kilman and film director Jonathan Demme. Demme and Kilman are longtime friends, and the three became close. As a result, Tony has appeared in a few of Demme's films and other films as well. During the late 1980s, he begin getting gallery shows in Chicago and New York City, establishing connections that would lead him to be a successful working artist who has sold paintings to several film directors, among others. Tony is also an accomplished poet and has published several books of his art and poetry, including The Hard Angels and The Neighborhood. Sports often figures into his art and poetry; especially his favorite baseball team, the Chicago White Sox, but he also gains inspiration from the city of Chicago, and the underbelly of society. Tony in his past has been a boxer, bouncer, and bartender; along with several jobs as a waiter.

In November 2009, Newcity named Tony Fitzpatrick the "Best iconic Chicago personality now that Studs is gone."[2]

Dennis McNett

Dennis McNett (born in 1972 in Virginia) is a printmaker living and working in Austin, TX.  McNett operates WolfBat Studios which was established in Brooklyn, NY in 2006,. Dennis McNett graduated from Pratt institute with an MFA degree in 2004, where he taught until 2012. He has shown internationally including The Victoria and Albert Museum in London, Me Collection Museum in Berlin, MOHS exhibit in Copenhagen, Galleria Patricia Armocida, Milano, Italy, and nationally including The Ft. Wayne Museum of Art, Museum of Print History, Houston, TX, Museum of Contemporary Art, Jacksonville, FL, and Jonathan LeVine Gallery, NYC, Known Gallery, LA. He has been interviewed and featured by the New York Times, Juxtapoz Magazine, NPR, the Houston Chronicle and other notable sources. McNett has also contributed as a visiting artist/lecturer at over thirty Universities, colleges and art centers such as RISD, Philadelphia Academy of Fine Art, Mexi-Arte Museum, Universidad De Monterrey Monterrey, Mexico, and the John Michelle Kohler Art Center. Aside from showing and contributing to fine art institutions, his work has filled the window displays of Barney’s in NYC, has been displayed on dozens of Antihero skateboards, can be found on murals/street in places such as NYC, Philadelphia and Richmond, VA.

Sue Coe

Sue Coe (born November 28, 1951 in Tamworth, Staffordshire) is an English artist and illustrator working primarily in drawing and printmaking, often in the form of illustrated books and comics. She grew up close to a slaughterhouse and developed a passion to stop cruelty to animals. Coe studied at the Royal College of Art in London, lived in New York City from 1972 to 2001. She currently lives in upstate New York. Her work is highly political, often directed against capitalism and cruelty to animals.For a quarter century she has explored factory farming, meat packing, apartheid, sweat shops, prisons, AIDS, and war. Her commentary on political events and social injustice is published in newspapers, magazines and books. The results of her investigations are hung in museum and gallery exhibitions and form an essential part of personal fine print collections by artists and activists alike. Coe's paintings and prints are auctioned as fund raisers for a variety of progressive causes, and since 1998, she has sold prints to benefit animal rights organizations.

Her major influences include the works of Chaïm Soutine and José Guadalupe Posada, Käthe Kollwitz, Francisco Goya and Rembrandt. She is a frequent contributor to World War 3 Illustrated, and has seen her work published in The Progressive, Mother Jones, Blab, The New York Times, The New Yorker, Time Magazine, Newsweek The Nation and countless other periodicals.

Carlos Hernandez

CARLOS HERNANDEZ

The work of Houston-based serigraphy artist Carlos Hernandez has been featured in the 2011 Communication Arts Typography annual, the 2011 & 2012 Communication Arts Illustration annual and was also recently published in the 2012 book Mexican Graphics by Korero Books- UK. He has designed and printed gig posters for such artists as The Kills, Arcade Fire, Kings of Leon, Santana, and more. Most recently, he was selected as the official poster artist to design the commemorative poster for the 2013 Austin City Limits Music Festival.

Carlos is a founding partner of Burning Bones Press, a full-service printmaking studio located in the Houston Heights, and has served as an instructor of Screen Printing at Rice University, Department of Visual and Dramatic Arts.

Corporate work has included Levis, American Express, Miller Brewing Company, Google, Lincoln Motor Company, Live Nation, New West Records, C3 Presents, Hohner USA, Goode Company, Underbelly, the Houston Chronicle, Saint Arnold Brewing Company and more. One of his career highlights has been his work with childhood idol and hot rod legend, Ed “Big Daddy” Roth. Carlos is also creator of the apparel line – Electric Calavera.

Carlos’ work was included in the 2012 Oso Bay Biennial Heavy Hitters Exhibition, as well as in the 2012 AIGA Texas Show. He has received awards from American Institute of Graphic Artists, American Advertising Federation, “Judges Favorite” from the Art Directors Club Houston, and “Best in Show” from the American Marketing Association.

Carlos was a featured speaker during the “Design Now – Houston” series at the Contemporary Arts Museum Houston and has served as an instructor at Frogman’s. He is a member of the legendary Outlaw Printmakers.

Carlos is a graduate of the Texas Tech Graphic Design Program.

Kathryn Polk

Kathryn Polk (born 1952) studied at the Memphis Art Academy and The University of Memphis. She lives and works in Indianne where she is the co-owner of L VIS Press, a lithography print studio. Polk’s lithographs are in the collections of The National Academy of Fine Art (Hangzhou, China), The University of Auckland (St. Auckland Central, New Zealand), Yonsei University Wonju Campus (Korea), University of Wales (Aberystwyth, UK), Bibliothèque Nationale de France, Pont Aven School of Contemporary Art (France), The University of Colorado-Boulder, Special Collections at The Denver Art Museum (CO), The University of Arizona Museum of Art (Tucson), St. Lawrence University (Canton, NY), The University of California-Davis Gorman Museum and Proyecto ‘Ace (Buenos Aires, Argentina).

Ericka Walker

Ericka Walker (born June 16, 1981 in Hartford, Wisconsin) is an American artist and printmaker. She lives and works in Halifax, Nova Scotia, Canada.

Julia Curran

Julia Curran (born April 5, 1988 in Saint Louis, Missouri) is an artist and printmaker living and working in Los Angeles, California. She is the youngest member of the Outlaw Printmakers and is known for her colorful and vivid large-scale silkscreen collages. According to her artist statement, Curran's work is "...a satirical deconstruction of American pop-culture and socio-political history, and how fear and the desires to own and to control drive hyper-masculinity and hyper-consumption." Curran primarily works in silkcreen, relief, and mixed-media collage.

External links
Evil Prints Official Site
"Brutal Truth" exhibition at SLUMA, 2011.
 Sean Starwars official site
Dennis McNett Official Website
 Julia Curran Official Website

References

American printmakers
Modern printmakers
American illustrators